The 101st Infantry Division (101. Infanterie-Division) was a unit of the Imperial German Army in World War I. The division was formed on May 3, 1915, and organized over the next few weeks. It was part of a wave of new infantry divisions formed in the spring of 1915. The division was reduced to a division staff for special purposes (Divisions-Stab z.b.V.) without troops in July 1917 and dissolved in January 1918.

The division was formed primarily from the excess infantry regiments of existing divisions that were being triangularized. The division's 201st Infantry Brigade was formerly the 75th Infantry Brigade of the 37th Infantry Division, and came to the division with the 146th Infantry Regiment. The 45th Infantry Regiment came from the 2nd Infantry Division and the 59th Infantry Regiment came from the 41st Infantry Division.

Combat chronicle
The 101st Infantry Division served on the Eastern Front, seeing its first action in the Gorlice-Tarnów Offensive. It crossed the Dnestr in June 1915, participated in the battles on the Galician and Russian Poland border, and advanced to the Bug by August. The division was then transferred south to participate in the Serbian Campaign. It reached Priština in late November and advanced to the Greek border in December. For most of 1916, and into 1917, the division remained on the Macedonian front. It underwent several changes, losing units to other divisions and receiving various replacements, and in July 1917, the division was dissolved as a tactical headquarters, with its subunits sent to other units. Its headquarters remained as a division staff for special purposes, administering Bulgarian units, until it was dissolved. Allied intelligence rated the division as third class.

Order of battle
The 101st Infantry Division was formed as a triangular division. The order of battle of the division on May 15, 1915, was as follows:

201. Infanterie-Brigade
8. Ostpreußisches Infanterie-Regiment Nr. 45
Infanterie-Regiment Freiherr Hiller von Gaertringen (4. Posensches) Nr. 59
1. Masurisches Infanterie-Regiment Nr. 146
1.Eskadron/Dragoner-Regiment König Albert von Sachsen (Ostpreußisches) Nr. 10
2.Eskadron/Dragoner-Regiment von Wedel (Pommersches) Nr. 11
Feldartillerie-Regiment Nr. 201
Fußartillerie-Batterie Nr. 101
Pionier-Kompanie Nr. 201

References
 101. Infanterie-Division (Chronik 1915/1918) - Der erste Weltkrieg
 Hermann Cron et al., Ruhmeshalle unserer alten Armee (Berlin, 1935)
 Hermann Cron, Geschichte des deutschen Heeres im Weltkriege 1914-1918 (Berlin, 1937)
 Günter Wegner, Stellenbesetzung der deutschen Heere 1825-1939. (Biblio Verlag, Osnabrück, 1993), Bd. 1
 Histories of Two Hundred and Fifty-One Divisions of the German Army which Participated in the War (1914-1918), compiled from records of Intelligence section of the General Staff, American Expeditionary Forces, at General Headquarters, Chaumont, France 1919 (1920)

Notes

Infantry divisions of Germany in World War I
Military units and formations established in 1915
Military units and formations disestablished in 1918
1915 establishments in Germany